Tomer Ben Yosef (born September 2, 1979) is an Israeli football player who plays as a central defender.

He started playing for Maccabi Petah Tikva in the Youth level alongside team-mates such as Gal Alberman and Omer Golan.

In his 10 years in Petah Tikva, Tomer won the Toto Cup, reached 2nd place in the league and also the State Cup Final.

In 2005 Ben Yosef was transferred to Beitar Jerusalem. In 2006 the veteran Arik Benado moved to Beitar. Initially, there were doubts whether Ben Yosef would stay in Beitar but eventually he stayed and maintained a consistent fixed role in the squad.

In September 2012, Ben-Yosef signed at Hapoel Tel Aviv for one year, After being released from Beitar Jerusalem.

Honours
Israeli championships
2006–07, 2007–08
State Cup
2008, 2009
Toto Cup
2003-04, 2009–10

References

External links
http://www.ynet.co.il/articles/0,7340,L-3906732,00.html

http://www.nrg.co.il/online/3/ART1/789/607.html
https://web.archive.org/web/20110721140457/http://sportline.co.il/?p=2083

1979 births
Living people
Israeli Jews
Israeli footballers
Association football defenders
Maccabi Petah Tikva F.C. players
Beitar Jerusalem F.C. players
Hapoel Tel Aviv F.C. players
Liga Leumit players
Israeli Premier League players
Footballers from Petah Tikva
Israel international footballers